Dionisio Cimarelli (born September 8, 1965 in Jesi, Italy) is an Italian sculptor known for contemporary figurative sculptures in Chinese porcelain and a sculpture of Matteo Ricci. He has held faculty positions at Fashion Institute of Technology, New York Academy of Art in New York City. and from 2015 to 2023 at The Art Students League of New York

Early life 
Dionisio Cimarelli was born in Jesi, Italy. In 1975, he was awarded first prize for a painting entered in Premio Natale, an art contest for primary school students.

Education 

In 1983, Cimarelli earned a diploma in sculpture at Liceo artistico  (formerly Istituto Statale d'Arte "E. Mannucci") in Ancona, Italy.

In 1989, he graduated in sculpture from the Accademia di Belle Arti di Carrara, Italy. To collect information for his thesis, in 1986 Dionisio traveled to China on the Trans-Siberian Railway to China. The trip was made possible by a letter of invitation from the sculptor , then president of the Art Academy. His travel history and his pictures while traveling were published on July 1988 on the Italian magazine “Tuttoturismo” in Milan, Italy.

In 1994, Cimarelli was awarded a diploma in sculpture at Scola prufesciunela per la artejanat artistich (School of specialization in sculpture of wooden figure) in Sëlva di Val Gardena, Italy. In 1995, he enrolled at the University of Paris in Paris, France. In 1997, he studied with sculptor Mikhail Anikushin at the Imperial Academy of Arts in St. Petersburg, Russia. In 1998, he attended the Academy of Fine Arts, Prague, Czech Republic.

Work 

Abstract
Cimarelli's began his career creating abstract anthropomorphic shapes inspired by surrealism. From 1983-1990, he produced works in terracotta, wood, bronze, and marble.

Realism
Inspired by his conservation experience at the Louvre Museum in Paris, France, Cimarelli moved to figurative sculpture in 1991. Studying techniques from sculptors such as Donatello, Michelangelo, Jacopo della Quercia, and Gian Lorenzo Bernini, he produced sculpture in wood, bronze, stone, and marble. In 2001, he created a marble sculpture of St. John the Baptist that was first exhibited in Oslo, Norway.

Figurative Chinese Series 
From 2007-2008, Cimarelli create a series of contemporary figurative sculpture in porcelain with colorful, jewel-like surface finishing in Jingdezhen in the Jiangxi province of China.

Restoration

Cimarelli has participated in several large sculptural and architectural restoration projects. From 1990-1991, he worked on the renovation of the Court Napoleon at the Louvre Museum in Paris. The courtyard surrounds the Louvre Pyramid designed by I.M. Pei. In 1995, he worked on the Christiansborg Palace Chapel in Copenhagen, Denmark. In 1998, he worked the Strasbourg Cathedral in Strasbourg, France and the Porte d'Aix in Marseille, France. In 2002, he restored the Institution of Civil Engineers headquarters in London, England. The following year, he worked on the restoration of the Stockholm Palace and House of Nobility in Stockholm, Sweden.

Zhongkai Sheshan Villas 

From 2007-2010, Cimarelli served as Art Supervisor for the Zhongkai Sheshan Villas in Shanghai, China. Designed by ten architectural firms from United States, the project consisted of 81 contemporary luxury villas. Four of the villas were designed by Mack Scogin of Mack Scogin Merrill Elam, architect and adjunct Professor of Architecture at Harvard University. Built with stone, marble, wood, and metal, Cimarelli oversaw the quality of materials and construction for the project.

Matteo Ricci sculpture

The Matteo Ricci sculpture was made in China, for the ITALY Pavilion at Shanghai World Expo 2010, on the 400th anniversary of his death. At the end of the show, it was also displayed for about two years at the Italian Embassy in Beijing. The sculpture is now property of the Government of the Marche Region and it stands today at Palazzo Ciccolini University of Macerata , while the plaster model is permanently placed at the main entrance of the Consulate General of Italy in Shanghai, China. In 2013 Finishing Performance of the original model in plaster of Matteo Ricci sculpture at the Italian Centre, former Italy Pavilion of Shanghai World EXPO 2010, Shanghai (China)

Teaching and lectures 

Cimarelli has been a visiting scholar at Wimbledon College of Art in London, England, and King Saud University in Riyadh, Saudi Arabia.

He has lectured internationally at universities including: Sir J.J. School of Art at the University of Mumbai, India; Silliman University in Dumaguete, Philippines; China Academy of Art in Hangzhou, China; China Central Academy of Fine Arts and Beijing Renwen University in Beijing, China; and Ontario College of Art & Design in Toronto, Canada.

Cimarelli has also been a guest speaker at University Club of New York for the Annual Savoy History Lecture, Montclair University  (New Jersey) USA, The Art Students League of New York (New York),  the Italian Cultural Institute in San Francisco, California (USA),  the Diocesan Museum in Jesi and the Beijing International Sculpture Forum organized by the Ministry of Culture of the People's Republic of China and China Sculpture Magazine in Beijing, at Mingyuan Art Centre and at Shanghai Library in Shanghai (China). In 2019 has been invited to tell his extraordinary life and artistic path at the Theatre Carlo Goldoni of Poggio San Marcello and at the Academy of Fine Arts of Macerata, Italy and at Columbia University. in New York City.

Awards and honors 

1993   Provincia Autonoma di Bolzano Sud, Tirol, Italy
1995   New York Academy of Art, New York, NY
1996   National Sculpture Society, New York, NY
1997   Ministero degli Affari Esteri e della Cooperazione Internazionale, Rome, Italy
2011 Spontini D'Oro, Maiolati Spontini, Italy
2015 Permanent Residence United States for Alien of extraordinary ability EB-1
2019   "Marchigiano of the Year in the world", at Senate of the Republic (Italy) in Rome

Solo exhibitions 

1999   Sculture e disegni, Berlin Philharmonie, Berlin, Germany
1999   Dionisio Cimarelli: Sculpture e disegni, Italian Cultural Institute, Berlin, Germany
1999   Dionisio Cimarelli: Sculpture e disegni, Wilhelm Galerie, Potsdam, Germany
2001   Dionisio Cimarelli, Galleri Asur, Oslo, Norway
2004   Dionisio Cimarelli Scultore: Il San Giovanni Battista, Chiesa della Cancellata, Maiolati Spontini, Italy
2005   Dionisio Cimarelli: Sculptures and Drawings, Consulate General of Italy, Shanghai, China
2008   Dionisio Cimarelli: Sculptures in Chinese Porcelain, Embassy of Italy Cultural Institute, Beijing, China
2011   Matteo Ricci, Embassy of Italy, Beijing, China
2013   Matteo Ricci, Italian Center, Shanghai, China

Selected group exhibitions 
2005 Beijing International Art Biennale, Beijing, China
2006 Shanghai International Biennial City Sculpture Exhibition, Shanghai, China
2007 Dumaguete Terracotta Sculpture Biennale, Dumaguete, Philippines
2008 Moon River Contemporary Art Museum, Beijing, China
2008 MOCA Shanghai, Shanghai, China
2009 Chinese International Sculpture Almanac Exhibition, Beijing and Hangzhou, China
2010 Centennial Celebration of Women in Art, Shanghai Art Museum, Shanghai, China
2010 Expo 2010, Italian Pavilion, Shanghai, China
2011 Venice Biennale - Padiglione ITALIA nel Mondo, Venice, Italy
2011 China Nandaihe International Sculpture Exhibition, Nandaihe, China
2014 Natura e Storia, Accademia di Belle Arti di Macerata Macerata, Italy
2015 The Art Students League of New York, USA
2016 The Art Students League of New York, USA

Film and documentary 

 2005 Dionisio Cimarelli, Documentary on Oriental Television, Art Channel, Shanghai, China

References

External links 
 ISSUU
 YOUTUBE
 Academia.edu

Living people
1965 births
20th-century Italian sculptors
20th-century Italian male artists
Italian male sculptors
21st-century Italian sculptors
Art Students League of New York faculty
Articles containing video clips
Italian emigrants to the United States
People from Iesi
People from the Province of Ancona
American male sculptors
Sculptors from New York (state)
21st-century Italian male artists